Michael A. Heller is a Professor of Real Estate Law at Columbia Law School. He concentrates on property law. Heller coined the term "tragedy of the anticommons" while working as a law professor at University of Michigan Law School in a 1998 Harvard Law Review article entitled "The Tragedy of the Anticommons: Property in the Transition from Marx to Markets".

Heller is a graduate of the Quaker Sidwell Friends School in Washington, DC, Harvard College, and Stanford Law School.  He worked as a summer associate at the Washington, DC white shoe law firm of Arnold & Porter LLP.
From 1994-2002, Heller taught at the University of Michigan Law School. He joined the Columbia Law School faculty in 2002.

Heller has focused on private property laws and international property dilemmas, publishing such articles as "The Liberal Commons" (with Hanoch Dagan), in the Yale Law Journal in 2001, and "A Property Theory Perspective on Russian Enterprise Reform," in Assessing The Rule of Law in Transition Economies, also in 2001.  His "Tragedy of the Anticommons" has sparked a debate among intellectual property theorists that continues to be discussed today. In 2008, Heller's book, The Gridlock Economy: How Too Much Ownership Wrecks Markets, Stops Innovation, and Costs Lives was published.

References

External links
 Michael Heller, AtGoogleTalks, August 19, 2008

Harvard College alumni
Stanford Law School alumni
Columbia University faculty
Living people
Columbia Law School faculty
University of Michigan Law School faculty
Sidwell Friends School alumni
Year of birth missing (living people)
Arnold & Porter people